Edgar Hart may refer to:

Edgar Hart, founder of Cleansing Service Group
Edgar Hart, character in 3 Women
Edgar Hart of the Hart baronets

See also
Hart (surname)